Rio Beni titi monkey (Plecturocebus modestus) is a species of titi monkey, a type of New World monkey, endemic to Bolivia.

References

Rio Beni titi
Mammals of Bolivia
Endemic fauna of Bolivia
Rio Beni titi
Taxa named by Einar Lönnberg